"Emperor’s New Clothes" is a song by American rock band Panic! at the Disco released as the third single from the band's fifth studio album, Death of a Bachelor, on October 21, 2015 through Fueled by Ramen and DCD2.

The song was written by Brendon Urie, Jake Sinclair, Lauren Pritchard, Sam Hollander and Dan Wilson. It was produced by Jake Sinclair. The music video for the song was uploaded to YouTube the day of its release, and serves as a sequel to the music video of "This Is Gospel". "Emperor's New Clothes" was nominated for Best Track at the 2016 Kerrang! Awards.

Music video
The music video for the song "Emperor's New Clothes" was uploaded to Fueled by Ramen's official YouTube page on October 21, 2015. The video was directed by Daniel "Cloud" Campos, who produced and directed Panic! at the Disco's music video for "This is Gospel", from the album Too Weird to Live, Too Rare to Die! (2013). The music video takes place following the events that happened in the video for "This is Gospel" and sees Urie's transition at the moment when his body dies and his soul heads off into a white light. "Emperor's New Clothes" takes over as Brendon begins searching through the white light and fog, only to be dropped through a trap door down into Hell and darkness. He becomes the new devil from materials (dust) around him, and at the end is smiling evilly while red light surrounds him as screaming and loud thumping is heard from off screen.

"Emperor's New Clothes" was named Video of the Year on Rock Sounds annual reader's poll in 2015. "Emperor's New Clothes" was nominated for Best Music Video at the 2016 Alternative Press Music Awards. The music video has over 295 million views as of December 2022, making it the most watched video of Death of a Bachelor.

Charts

Weekly charts

Year-end charts

Certifications

References

2015 singles
2015 songs
Fueled by Ramen singles
Panic! at the Disco songs
Songs written by Brendon Urie
Songs written by Sam Hollander
Songs written by Dan Wilson (musician)
Songs written by Lolo (singer)
Songs written by Jake Sinclair (musician)